Filipinos in Japan (Zainichi Firipinjin) formed a population of 291,066 in June 2022 individuals, making them Japan's fourth-largest foreign community, according to the statistics of the Philippines. Filipinos in Japan formed a population of 325,000 individuals at year-end 2020, making them Japan's third-largest foreign community along with Vietnamese, according to the statistics of the Philippine Global National Inquirer and the Ministry of Justice.  Their population reached as high as 245,518 in 1998, but fell to 144,871 individuals in 2000 before beginning to recover slightly when Japan cracked down on human trafficking. In 2006, Japanese/Filipino marriages were the most frequent of all international marriages in Japan. As of 2016, the Filipino population in Japan was 237,103 according to the Ministry of Justice. In December 2021, the number of Filipinos in Japan was estimated at 276,615.

According to figures published by the Central Bank of the Philippines, overseas Filipino workers in Japan remitted more than US$1 billion between 1990 and 1999; one newspaper described the contributions of overseas workers as a "major source of life support for the Philippines' ailing economy." Though most Filipinos in Japan are short-term residents, the history of their community extends back further; during the Japanese occupation of the Philippines, some Filipino students studied in Japanese universities.

Media
There is a magazine called Kumusta! (クムスタ). Junta Shimozawa publishes and edits the Japanese portion and his spouse Hermie edits the Tagalog version. In 1996 it had a weekly circulation of 30,000, and its website was to appear in March of that month.

Notable people

Entertainment
 Ruby Moreno, actress
 Mokomichi Hayami, actor, chef, TV presenter, entrepreneur, and model
 Miho Nishida, actress and model
 Nicole Abe, fashion model
 Noriyuki Abe, film director
 Sayaka Akimoto, actress and singer
 Stan "Xtra" Fukase, drag queen and social media influencer
 Hiromi, fashion model
 Elaiza Ikeda, fashion model and actress
 Mark Ishii, voice actor
 Rie Kaneko, model and singer
 Loveli, fashion model
 Rika Mamiya, model and singer
 Megumi Nakajima, voice actress and singer
 Maiko Nakamura, singer
 Chieko Ochi, singer, model and actress
 Aiko Otake, model
 Reimy, musician
 Rikako Sasaki, singer
 Alan Shirahama, actor and DJ
 Anna Suda, actress and dancer
 Kiara Takahashi
 Maryjun Takahashi, actress and model
 Yu Takahashi, actress
 Zawachin, television personality
 Ruben Aquino, animator
 , model, gravure idol and actress
 , model, gravure idol and actress
 , singer, dancer and idol for BXW
 , singer, dancer and idol on Produce 101 Japan (season 2)
 , singer, dancer and idol on Produce 101 Japan (season 2)
 Yuri Komagata, singer and voice actress
 Yuki Kimura, model, gravure idol and actress
 Yuki Sonoda (screen name: Yana Fuentes), model, actress, Miss Universe Japan 2020 2nd Runner-Up

Sport
 Tomohiko Hoshina, judoka
 Masunoyama Tomoharu, sumo wrestler
 Asahi Masuyama, footballer
 Hikaru Minegishi, footballer
 Mitakeumi Hisashi, sumo wrestler
 Mucha Mori, basketball player
 Kodo Nakano, judoka
 Ryuya Ogawa, baseball player
 Satoshi Ōtomo, footballer
 Risa Sato, volleyball player
 Daisuke Sato, footballer
 Syuri, pro wrestler and MMA competitor
 Yuji Takahashi, footballer
 Takayasu Akira, sumo wrestler
 Paulo Junichi Tanaka, footballer
 Chiaki Tone, baseball player
 Emi Watanabe, figure skater
 Kiyomi Watanabe, judoka
 Yuka Saso, golfer
 Edward Yamamoto, basketball player
 Yasuaki Yamasaki, baseball player
 Maharu Yoshimura, table tennis player
 Tsukii Junna, karateka
Hirotaka Urabe, kickboxer
Koya Urabe, kickboxer
 Jefferson Tabinas, footballer
Paul Tabinas, footballer

Other
 Artemio Ricarte, Philippine general

See also
 Japan–Philippines relations
 Ethnic groups of Japan
 Japanese settlement in the Philippines
 Smile (TBS), a TV series which focused on a half Japanese, half Filipino man

References

Further reading

External links
 Timog BBS
 JFsekai.com The Home of the Japanese-Filipino Community 
 SilanganPilipino.com Ang bagong tambayan ng Pinoy.
 Oyaye: Filipino Social Networking Community Abroad

Ethnic groups in Japan
Japan

Japan–Philippines relations
Asian diaspora in Japan